Sarzamelah (also Romanized as Sarzāmelah and Sar Zāmleh) is a village in Poshtdarband Rural District, in the Central District of Kermanshah County, Kermanshah Province, Iran. At the 2006 census, its population was 41, in 11 families.

References 

Populated places in Kermanshah County